X Factor is the Danish version of british Tv show The X Factor, created by Simon Cowell. The show premiered on 4 January 2008. For the first eleven seasons, the show was broadcast on DR1 before moving to TV 2 from the twelfth season onwards. There have been fifteen winners to date, most notable are Martin Hoberg Hedegaard (2008), Thomas Ring Petersen (2010), Anthony Jasmin (2014), Place on Earth (2018) & Mads Moldt (2022).

The original judging panel consisted of Thomas Blachman, Lina Rafn and Remee. The current panel consists of Blachman and Martin Jensen. Former judges include Soulshock, Pernille Rosendahl, Cutfather, Ida Corr, Anne Linnet, Mette Lindberg, Sanne Salomonsen and Oh Land. The original host was Lise Rønne. The current host is Sofie Linde, who has hosted the show since season 9. Former presenters include Signe Muusmann and Signe Molde.

On 14 August 2017, DR announced that the show would end after the eleventh season. On 21 December 2017, TV 2 announced that they had acquired the rights to the show. In 2022, it was announced that X Factor had been renewed for a sixteenth season.

Judging history 

On 15 October 2007, jazz musician Thomas Blachman, Infernal singer Lina Rafn and songwriter Remee were announced as judges for season 1. On 18 September 2008, Rafn confirmed that she would be returning as a judge for season 2. The following day, it was confirmed that Blachman and Remee would be returning as judges for season 2.

On 13 August 2009, Rafn announced that she would not be returning as a judge for season 3 due to her pregnancy. On 1 October 2009, Blachman confirmed that he would also not be returning as a judge for season 3. On 5 October 2009, it was confirmed that Remee would be returning as a judge for season 3. On 8 October 2009, record producer Soulshock was confirmed as Blachman's replacement. On 15 October 2009, it was announced that The Storm singer Pernille Rosendahl would replace Rafn as the third and final judge for season 3 alongside Remee and Soulshock.

On 19 September 2010, Soulshock confirmed that he had been dropped as a judge for season 4. On 21 September 2010, Blachman confirmed that he would be returning as a judge for season 4, replacing Soulshock. The following day, it was confirmed that Rosendahl would be returning as a judge for season 4. On 24 September 2010, it was confirmed that record producer Cutfather would replace Remee as a judge for season 4. On 13 September 2011, it was announced that Blachman, Rosendahl and Cutfather would be returning as judges for season 5.

On 20 December 2011, Blachman announced that he would be leaving the show at the conclusion of season 5. On 8 February 2012, Rosendahl announced that she would also be leaving the show after season 5 due to starring in the musical Hey Jude. On 10 February 2012, Cutfather announced that season 5 would be his last season as a judge in order to return to his career due to "the show mentally taking time and thought space." On 20 August 2012, despite announcing that he would be leaving the show at the conclusion of season 5, it was confirmed that Blachman would be returning as a judge for season 6, while singers Ida Corr and Anne Linnet would replace Rosendahl and Cutfather.

On 18 September 2013, it was confirmed that Rafn and Remee would be returning to replace Corr and Linnet as judges for season 7 alongside Blachman. On 18 August 2014, it was confirmed that Blachman, Rafn and Remee would be returning as judges for season 8.

On 15 July 2015, Rafn confirmed that she would not be returning as a judge for season 9 due to an Infernal concert tour. On 12 August 2015, it was confirmed that The Asteroids Galaxy Tour singer Mette Lindberg would replace Rafn as a judge for season 9 alongside returning judges Blachman and Remee. On 12 August 2016, it was confirmed that Blachman, Remee and Lindberg would be returning as judges for season 10.

On 2 August 2017, Lindberg announced that she would not be returning as a judge for season 11. On 10 August 2017, it was confirmed that singer Sanne Salomonsen would replace Lindberg as a judge for season 11 alongside returning judges Blachman and Remee.

On 11 April 2018, it was confirmed that Blachman would be returning as a judge for season 12. The following day, Remee confirmed that he would not be returning as a judge for season 12. On 26 April 2018, it was confirmed that Salomonsen would not be returning as a judge for season 12 due to joining DR1's new television music competition LIVE! Danmarks nye live-artist as a judge. On 8 August 2018, it was announced that rapper Ankerstjerne and singer Oh Land would replace Remee and Salomonsen as judges for season 12 alongside Blachman. On 15 August 2019, it was confirmed that Blachman, Ankerstjerne and Oh Land would be returning as judges for season 13.

On 2 July 2020, Ankerstjerne confirmed that he would not be returning as a judge for season 14 in order to focus on "new dreams and projects," but did not rule out a return in the future. On 11 September 2020, it was announced that DJ Martin Jensen would replace Ankerstjerne as a judge for season 14 alongside returning judges Blachman and Oh Land.

On 23 July 2021, Oh Land announced that she would not be returning as a judge for season 15, stating that she "could not do everything at once."

Hosts and Judges

Series overview
To date, sixteen seasons have been broadcast, as summarised below. The sixteenth season will premiere in 2023.

Judges' categories and their contestants
Key:
 – Winning judge/category. Winners are in bold, eliminated contestants in small font.

Season synopses

2008–2018: DR

Season 1 (2008)

The first season premiered on 4 January 2008 and ended on 28 March 2008. The host was Lise Rønne, while the judges were jazz musician Thomas Blachman, Infernal singer Lina Rafn and songwriter Remee.

The auditions took place from 3 to 4 November 2007 at DR Byen in Copenhagen and 7 to 8 November 2007 at DR Østjylland in Århus. The audition episodes were broadcast over three episodes on 4, 11 and 18 January 2008. After the auditions, the judges were given their categories. Remee was given the 15-24s, Rafn was given the Groups, and Blachman was given the Over 25s. For bootcamp, the judges disbanded and took their categories to three different locations. Remee took the 15-24s to Puk-studierne in Randers, Rafn took the Groups to Hotel Marienlyst in Helsingør and Blachman took the Over 25s to Dragsholm Castle in Hørve. The judges were also accompanied by an assistant, who worked in the music industry. Remee was assisted by record producer Cutfather, Rafn was assisted by Border Breakers director Michael Guldhammer, and Blachman was assisted by composer Kasper Winding. Bootcamp was broadcast over two episodes on 25 January and 1 February 2008. The live shows began on 8 February 2008 at DR Byen. During the sixth week of the live shows, Anne Linnet helped mentor the acts. Shayne Ward, who won the second series of the original British version, performed on the sixth results show. James Blunt performed on the seventh results show.

During the semi-final on 21 March 2008, Remee became the winning mentor after his two acts Martin and Laura advanced to the final. Martin won the first season on 28 March 2008, defeating Laura, and won a recording contract with Sony BMG. He released "The 1" as his winner's single. "The 1" was written by singer Niels Brinck and produced by Per Sunding, which would be released by Martin or Laura if they won.

Season 2 (2009)

Remee, Lina Rafn and Thomas Blachman returned as judges. Remee was given the Groups, Rafn was given the Over 25s and Blachman was in charge of the Under 25s. The winner was Linda Andrews, mentored by Rafn.

Season 3 (2010)

Remee returned as a judge, while Thomas Blachman and Lina Rafn were replaced by Soulshock and Pernille Rosendahl. Soulshock was given the Groups, Rosendahl was given the Over 25s and Remee was in charge of the Under 25s. The winner was Thomas Ring Petersen, mentored by Rosendahl. British singer and X Factor UK judge Cheryl Cole performed her number one single "Fight for This Love".

Season 4 (2011)

Pernille Rosendahl continued as a judge, while original judge Thomas Blachman and new judge Cutfather replaced Soulshock and Remee on the judging panel. Cutfather was given the Under 25s, Rosendahl was given the Groups and Blachman was given the Over 25s. The winner was Sarah, mentored by Cutfather.

Season 5 (2012)

Thomas Blachman, Pernille Rosendahl and Cutfather returned for their respective fourth, third and second seasons. Cutfather was given the Over 25s, Rosendahl was given the Under 25s and Blachman was in charge of the Groups. The winner was Ida Østergaard Madsen, mentored by Rosendahl.

For the first (and currently only) time, a judge made an unforced decision to eliminate their own act.

Season 6 (2012–13)

Thomas Blachman returned to the judging panel, while Pernille Rosendahl and Cutfather were replaced by new judges Ida Corr and Anne Linnet. Linnet was given the Groups, Corr was given the Over 24s and Blachman was in charge of the Under 24s. The winner was Chresten, mentored by Corr.

Season 7 (2014)

The seventh season returned to the original judging panel consisting of Thomas Blachman, Lina Rafn and Remee following the departures of Ida Corr and Anne Linnet. Remee had the Over 23s, Rafn had the 15-22s and Blachman was in charge of the Groups. The winners were Anthony Jasmin, mentored by Blachman.

Season 8 (2015)

Thomas Blachman, Remee and Lina Rafn returned to the judging panel for their respective seventh, fifth and fourth seasons. Remee was given the 15-22s, Rafn was given the Over 23s and Blachman was given the Groups. Superbootcamp was replaced by 5 Chair Challenge. The winner was Emilie Esther, mentored by Remee.

Season 9 (2016)

Thomas Blachman and Remee will return as judges for season 9 along with a new judge Mette Lindberg who will replace Lina Rafn. Rafn said in the final of season 8 that she did not know if she would continue as a judge. Eva Harlou announced on 26 June 2015 that she will not return to host. Sofie Linde Lauridsen will be the new host. Rafn announced on 15 July 2015 that she would not be returning as a judge. The winners were Embrace mentored by Remee.

Season 10 (2016–17)

Thomas Blachman, Mette Lindberg and Remee Will all return for Season 10 and Sofie Linde will also return as host
On 31 March 2016  it was announced that X Factor will return for season 10 in 2017. It will begin on 30 December 2016 the winner was Morten Nørgaard mentored by Remee.

Season 11 (2018)

On 31 March 2017, it was announced by DR that X Factor will return for season 11 in 2018. Sofie Linde Lauridsen will return to host the show for the 3rd time Thomas Blachman and Remee also returned and is joined by a new judge Sanne Salomonsen who will replace Mette Lindberg. The Winner was Place on Earth mentored by Thomas Blachman

2019–present: TV2

Season 12 (2019)

Sofie Linde Lauridsen will return to host the show for the 4th time Thomas Blachman returned and is joined by a new judges Oh Land and Ankerstjerne who will replace Remee and Sanne Salomonsen. The Winner was Kristian Kjærlund mentored by Thomas Blachman

Season 13 (2020)

Thomas Blachman, Oh Land and Ankerstjerne Will all return as judges for Season 13 and Sofie Linde Ingversen also return as host for the 5th time. The Winner was Alma Agger mentored by Thomas Blachman

Season 14 (2021)

Thomas Blachman and Oh Land returned as judges for Season 14 while Ankerstjerne left and was replaced by Martin Jensen and Sofie Linde Ingversen only returned as host for the auditions, 5 Chair Challenge and bootcamp Lise Rønne returned as host for the live shows also. The Winner was Solveig Lindelof mentored by Oh Land

Season 15 (2022)

Thomas Blachman and Martin Jensen will return as judges for Season 15 but Oh Land has announced that she will leave as a judge and was replaced by Kwamie Liv and Sofie Linde Ingversen will return as the main host.

Season 16 (2023)

Thomas Blachman and Kwamie Liv will return as judges for Season 16 but Martin Jensen has announced that he will leave as a judge and was replaced by Simon Kvamm and Sofie Linde Ingversen will return as the main host.

Controversy
The Danish X Factor has been criticised by music expert and consultant for The Danish Musicians' Association (Dansk Musiker Forbund) Mikael Højris, who claims that the contracts for participation in the show are unfair on participants and almost amount to serfdom to DR1 (the channel airing the show) stating that clauses in the contracts forbid the participants - whether they pass the first round or not - from performing or participating in any other musical event for three months. He also criticises that participants are obliged to travel at their own expense.

Bente Boserup, leader of BørneTelefonen, criticized the Danish X Factor for exposing children under 18 to high pressure and stress, after contestants Baraa Qadoura and Tannaz Hakami broke down in tears during the fourth live show of season 8. This was supported by psychologist John Halse, as well as contestant Finn Irs, who protested by not showing up to the all-stars song during the final live show. Irs stated that the producers were more interested in their contestants showing their emotions, rather than making a musical show. Jan Lagermand Lundme, the contributing editor on DR1, stated that all contestants were checked by a psychologist to see if they were fit to handle the pressure.

Despite this, the series has remained quite popular within the Danish public.

References

External links 
  X Factor website

 
Danish reality television series
Television series by Fremantle (company)
2008 Danish television series debuts
Danish television series based on British television series
DR TV original programming